Extremely Rotten Live is a live album by Swedish death metal band Grave, was released in 1997.

At the time, this was the final recorded work by the band before their temporary break-up, and is rather infamous amongst its fanbase as a result of a lack of proper crowd interaction and the energy seemingly being drained from the group as they performed.

Track listing

Personnel
Grave
 Ola Lindgren - Guitars, Vocals
 Jonas Torndal - Bass
 Jens "Jensa" Paulsson - Drums

Production
 Paul Marr - Recording Engineer
 Tim Yasui - Assistant Engineer

References

Grave (band) albums
1997 live albums